Sniders & Abrahams was an Australian tobacco manufacturing company formed in Melbourne. It was the first Australian company to mass-produce cigarettes.

See also
List of cigar brands

References

External links

Australian companies established in 1886
Cigar manufacturing companies
Tobacco companies of Australia
Manufacturing companies of Australia